Spring Garden Township is one of sixteen townships in Jefferson County, Illinois, USA.  As of the 2010 census, its population was 3,307 and it contained 649 housing units.

Geography
The township is centered at 38°10'N 88°53'W (38.174,-88.877). It is traversed north–south by Interstate Route 57 and State Route 37.

Cities, towns, villages
 Bonnie
 Ina

Unincorporated towns
 Spring Garden at 
(This list is based on USGS data and may include former settlements.)

Adjacent townships
 Dodds Township (north)
 Pendleton Township (northeast)
 Moore's Prairie Township (east)
 Northern Township, Franklin County (southeast)
 Ewing Township, Franklin County (south)
 Barren Township, Franklin County (southwest)
 Elk Prairie Township (west)

Cemeteries
The township contains these seven cemeteries: Carroll, Fitzgerrell, Hope, Kirk, Knowles, Round Knob and Smith.

Major highways
  Interstate 57

Landmarks
 Holiness Camp

Demographics

Political districts
 Illinois's 19th congressional district
 State House District 107
 State Senate District 54

References
 
 United States Census Bureau 2007 TIGER/Line Shapefiles
 United States National Atlas

External links
 City-Data.com
 Illinois State Archives

Townships in Jefferson County, Illinois
Mount Vernon, Illinois micropolitan area
Townships in Illinois